Sunnybrook Research Institute (SRI) is the research component of Sunnybrook Health Sciences Centre in Toronto, Ontario. It is one of the largest research centres in Canada and is fully affiliated with the University of Toronto. The institute employs over 300 scientists and clinician-scientists and has a total of over 1300 research staff.

Disciplines and Platforms

Each scientist at Sunnybrook Research Institute (SRI) belongs to a platform and a program.

Research Platforms
 Biological sciences
 Evaluative clinical sciences
 Physical sciences

Research programs
 Brain Sciences
 Cancer (Odette Cancer Centre)
 Heart (Schulich Heart Centre)
 Musculoskeletal (Holland Musculoskeletal Centre)
 St. John's Rehab Research
 Trauma, Emergency & Critical Care
 Veterans & Community
 Women & Babies

Commercialization

Sunnybrook Research Institute has been issued a total of 64 patents and currently have 29 active licences.
Several spinoff companies have emerged from SRI, including VisualSonics Inc., Sentinelle Medical Inc. and Profound Medical Inc.

References

External links
 Sunnybrook Research Institute

Medical research institutes in Canada
University of Toronto
Companies based in Toronto